The Papuan lorikeet (Charmosyna papou) is a species of parrot in the family Psittaculidae.
It is found in New Guinea.
Its natural habitat is subtropical or tropical moist montane forests.

Taxonomy and systematics 
The generic name Charmosyna is from the Greek kharmosunos, meaning joyful. The specific epithet papou refers to New Guinea.

The species is monotypic. The former subspecies C. p. stellae, C. p. wahnesi, and C. p. goliathina are now treated as a separate species, Stella's lorikeet (Charmosyna stellae).

References

Papuan lorikeet
Papuan lorikeet
Taxonomy articles created by Polbot